Hauffenia minuta is a species of minute freshwater snail with an operculum, aquatic gastropod mollusc or micromollusc in the family Hydrobiidae. This species is found in France and Switzerland.

References

Hauffenia
Hydrobiidae
Gastropods described in 1805
Taxonomy articles created by Polbot
Taxobox binomials not recognized by IUCN